Grants Pass High School is a public high school located in Grants Pass, Oregon, United States. The school colors are blue and white, and the mascot is the Caveman. The mascot is a reference to the Oregon Caves National Monument, which is an important tourist attraction in nearby Cave Junction, Oregon.

History
Grants Pass High School was originally built in 1885, in a wooden building located at Fourth and C Streets. The first graduating class was in 1888. Around 1911 a new building was built at the center of the present campus on Olive Street, between 8th and 9th Streets. In 1939, North Junior High School was built next door. Various other additions to the campus occurred between 1948 and 1969, including expansions to the central building as well as numerous satellite buildings. When North Junior High School was relocated, its old campus became the English Building. In 1988, a fire destroyed the grandstands on Mel-Ingram Field and damaged the large gym. The grandstands were replaced in 1989 on the west side of the field.

In 1998, the entire campus was demolished and re-constructed. The facility is now a state-of-the-art high school, complete with a performing arts center which is also used as a convention center and theater for the community. In addition to the  performing arts center, the campus also consists of a main building (housing the library, front office, counseling office, and career center), the commons (housing the cafeteria), the arts/science building, the vocational/technical building, and Heater/Newman Memorial Gymnasium. The gymnasium features 'pit' style seating and contains an indoor running track..

Academics
In 2008, 81% of the school's seniors received a high school diploma. Of 448 students, 363 graduated, 49 dropped out, five received a modified diploma, and 31 were still in high school in 2009.  In 2017, 72% of the school's seniors received a high school diploma, 5% lower than the state average of 77%.

In 2017 the school had higher absentee rates, across all grades, than the state average.

Athletics
Grants Pass High School is a Southwest Conference 6A-6 OSAA High School. Teams include football, cross country, volleyball, equestrian, swimming, skiing, basketball, wrestling, soccer, bowling, baseball, golf, softball and tennis. Traditionally, Grants Pass exceeds in wrestling and volleyball. The swim team has placed first at the 6A district meet, and has consistently sent swimmers to the state championship.

In December of 1948, the Cavemen won the state football championship after defeating Jefferson High School 6-0. During the return trip, the chartered bus transporting the team went off the side of the road, resulting in the deaths of two athletes: Sterling Heater and Al Newman. Because the trophy was badly damaged during the accident, the OSAA offered to replace it with a new trophy in exchange for the old, damaged one. However, the team refused to give up the trophy, and the OSAA eventually allowed the school to keep both trophies.

In the 2014 football season, the Cavemen went 9-0 during the regular season en route to becoming the undefeated SW Conference Champions. During that season, the Cavemen put up over 50 points on four occasions, over 70 points twice during the regular season, and over 70 once again in the playoffs. The season ended with a loss in the third round of the playoffs to West Salem.

State championships
 Football: 1948, 1951, 1964, 1967
 Boys basketball: 1962
Wrestling: 1962, 1963, 1964
Cheerleading: 1988
Softball: 2008, 2010
Boys track and field: 1947, 2015

Extracurricular activities
Grants Pass High School offers many extracurricular clubs and programs, including Academic Masters, Brain Bowl, Choir, Leadership, Marching Band and Color Guard, Math Team, Music Honor Society, Mock Trial, National Honor Society, Orchestra, Skills USA, State of Jefferson Scavenger Hunt, and Theatre.

The school's Mock Trial team, under the direction of Jennifer Tyrell for several years, and then Dianne Mackin in 2020, qualified for and competed in the state Mock Trial competition at the Portland Mark O. Hatfield courthouse. In 2020, along with the team placing first, one of the team members, Adam Gross, was awarded the first ever ranked attorney award at regionals for highest scoring participant. 

The school's marching band, under the direction of Jason Garcia, was named the 2010 NWAPA circuit champions for their production "Traffic". The Marching Band and Auxiliary performed in the 2010 Macy's Thanksgiving Day Parade by invitation on November 25, 2010. In 2018, they were named the NWAPA circuit champions with their production "One Step Closer." The Marching Band and Auxiliary were invited to perform in the 2018 Macy's Thanksgiving Day Parade. In 2019, the team won their second consecutive circuit title with their production "Over Under." As of 2020, the band's current director is Lewis Norfleet.

The school's Brain Bowl team has held the title of Division A champions for two consecutive years.

The school also offers a wide variety of clubs, including Anime Club, Dungeons & Dragons Club, Environmental Action Club, Future Business Leaders of America, German Club, History Club, Future Health Professionals, Interact Club, Key Club, Minority Education Challenge Adversity, Mock Trial, Native American Student Union, Origami Club, Robotics Engineering Club, Southern Oregon Pride, Speech and Debate, Yearbook Club, Young Life Club, and Z Club.

Walkout controversy
On November 16, 2021, a student-lead walkout in support of the LGBTQ+ community occurred. The walkout was organized in response to the controversial decision by the school district to reinstate Rachel Damiano and Katie Medart, two middle school educators who had previously been terminated for violating district policy. Damiano and Medart had founded the online movement "I Resolve", which advocated for a more restrictive approach to gender identity at schools. The student protest soon attracted counter-protesters with religious affiliations, leading to a heated clash between the two groups. The Grants Pass Police Deparment made three arrests at the event, including a 15-year-old student who was ticketed for allegedly spitting in a counterprotestors face, and a 14-year-old student who was alleged to have assaulted the same man with a broomstick. The protest and subsequent arrests gained significant media coverage.

Notable people

Alumni

 David Anders, actor (aka David Holt)
 Ethen Beavers, comic book artist
 Tom Blanchard, former professional football player 
 Brandon Drury, professional baseball player
 Bob "Hardcore Holly" Howard, professional wrestler
 Merrill McPeak, 14th Chief of Staff of the United States Air Force
 Jerry Sherk, NFL player

Faculty
 John Tully, former coach

References

External links
Official website
Grants Pass High School at GreatSchools
Grants Pass High School at SchoolDigger

High schools in Josephine County, Oregon
Grants Pass, Oregon
Educational institutions established in 1885
Public high schools in Oregon
1885 establishments in Oregon